Local elections were held in the United Kingdom on 6 May 1976. Elections were for one third of the seats on Metropolitan borough councils and for all seats on Non-Metropolitan district councils in England; and for all seats on the Welsh district councils.

The elections were the first electoral test for the new Prime Minister James Callaghan, and were a major reverse for the ruling Labour Party. The opposition Conservative party made large gains of seats and control of councils at the expense of both Labour and the Liberal Party.

The Conservatives easily gained control of their principal target council, Birmingham. The new administration in the city pledged to reintroduce the sale of council houses, which had been stopped by the previous Labour-controlled council. Control of another five metropolitan borough councils were gained by the Conservatives at Labour's expense. The party also gained numerous non-metropolitan districts, including large towns and cities such as Derby, Exeter, Ipswich, Leicester, Luton, Milton Keynes, Oxford, Peterborough and York.

Major English councils held by Labour included Manchester, Norwich, Nottingham and Stoke-on-Trent.

Break-away groups from the official Labour Party achieved success in two districts. The Lincoln Democratic Labour Association retained control of the city council. The association had been formed following the expulsion of local member of parliament, Dick Taverne from the party. In Blyth Valley the Independent Labour Party gained nine seats from the official Labour candidates. The ILP were supporters of Eddie Milne, former MP for Blyth. Milne had been expelled from Labour in April 1974. Labour lost control of North East Derbyshire, where all the party's seats in Clay Cross passed to Ratepayer candidates. The town had been the scene of a dispute between the former urban district council and the government over the Housing Finance Act.

The Liberals lost control of their only local authority, Liverpool City Council. Labour became the largest party on the council, which was under no overall control.

In Wales, the dominant position of Labour was overturned. Major Labour losses were Cardiff and Newport to the Conservatives, Swansea to Ratepayers and Merthyr Tydfil to Plaid Cymru.

Summary of results

England

Metropolitan boroughs

District councils

A

† New ward boundaries

B

† New ward boundaries

C

† New ward boundaries

D

† New ward boundaries

E

† New ward boundaries

F

† New ward boundaries

G

† Ward boundary changes

H

† New ward boundaries

I

K

† New ward boundaries

L

† New ward boundaries

M

† New ward boundaries

N

O

† New ward boundaries

P

† New ward boundaries

R

† New ward boundaries

S

† New ward boundaries

T

† New ward boundaries

U

† New ward boundaries

V

† New ward boundaries

W

† New ward boundaries

Y

Totals

Wales

District councils

References

Local elections 2006. House of Commons Library Research Paper 06/26.
Vote 1999 BBC News
Vote 2000 BBC News

 
1976
Local elections
Local elections